Surfin' Safari is the debut album by the American rock band the Beach Boys, released October 1, 1962 on Capitol Records. The official production credit went to Nick Venet, though it was Brian Wilson with his father Murry who contributed substantially to the album's production; Brian also wrote or co-wrote nine of its 12 tracks. The album reached number 32 in the US during a chart stay of 37 weeks.

The album was preceded by two singles: "Surfin'" and "Surfin' Safari", which charted at numbers 75 and 14, respectively. The success of "Surfin' Safari" helped secure a full album for the group while an additional single, "Ten Little Indians", was issued, charting at number 49.

Background

Production
Recording sessions for Surfin' Safari took place in Capitol's basement studios in the famous tower building in August. During the sessions, Brian Wilson fought for, and won, the right to helm the production – though this fact was not acknowledged with an album liner notes production credit. David Marks remembered, "Brian did everything. Played, did the arrangements, screwed up the lead sheets himself. He didn't need any help to do that. You listen to those first albums and they sound campy and corny but Brian was dead serious."

Songs

Side one
"County Fair" was inspired by Gary Usher and Brian Wilson visiting a county fair in San Bernardino. The song was written in about ten minutes. "Ten Little Indians" saw the group trying to emulate the style of the song "Running Bear". "Little Miss America" features a doo-wop style, and according to biographer David Leaf, is about "the ideal southern California dream girl".

In "Chug-a-Lug", written by Brian and Usher, the lyrics refer to Usher, Marks, Carl, and Dennis, as well as a Larry. The latter was possibly Larry Lennear, a saxophonist who played and recorded with Brian at the time. "409" was written about Usher's obsession over hot-rods. The car sound effects were recorded by Usher driving his car past the home of the Wilsons, who had set a tape recorder up outside using a 100-foot extension cord.

Side two
Brian stated that the song "Surfin'" was composed after Dennis told him "surfing’s getting really big. You guys ought to write a song about it." "Heads You Win, Tails I Lose" was written because of Usher and Brian Wilson's frequent use of coin flipping to decide things. The group wanted to make contemporary expressions into songs.

The instrumental "Moon Dawg", originally performed by the Gamblers, was considered the first surf record. The Beach Boys became the first group to cover the song, exposing it to a much wider audience. "The Shift" was presented as a "fashion statement" from Brian and Love.

Release and reception

The album was released through Capitol on October 1, 1962, and peaked at No. 32. Lead single, "Surfin'", was later credited with creating the genre of California Sound, a music aesthetic primarily revolving around surfing, hot rod culture, and youthful innocence. "409" was similarly credited with starting the hot rod music craze of the 1960s, According to Usher, Capitol chose "Ten Little Indians" as the second single due to thinking that surf music was a fad.

Richie Unterberger, in a retrospective review for AllMusic, felt that most of the songs on Surfin' Safari are substandard, but that as the album was recorded by the Beach Boys themselves rather than session musicians, it offered an opportunity to hear what the band sounded like in the studio.

Track listing

Notes
 Mike Love was not originally credited for "Chug-A-Lug" and "409". His credits were awarded after a 1994 court case.
 Some reissue pressings omit "Surfin'" and "Cuckoo Clock", and move "Chug-A-Lug" to the beginning of side two.

Charts

References

External links

 

The Beach Boys albums
1962 debut albums
Capitol Records albums
Albums produced by Nick Venet
Albums recorded at Capitol Studios